Daniel Edward Fleming is an American biblical scholar and Assyriologist whose work centers on Hebrew Bible interpretation and cultural history, ancient Syria, Emar, ancient religion, and the interplay of ancient Near Eastern societies. Since 1990, he has served as a professor of Hebrew Bible and Ancient Near Eastern Studies in the Skirball Department of Hebrew and Judaic Studies at New York University, where he has spent his whole career.

Career 
Fleming received his B.A. at Stanford University in 1979 and his Master of Divinity from Gordon-Conwell Theological Seminary in 1985 before earning his doctoral degree in Near Eastern Languages and Civilizations from Harvard University in 1990. After receiving his Ph.D., he was immediately appointed to the Department of Hebrew and Judaic Studies at New York University. Fleming is a recipient of the Guggenheim Fellowship (2004–05), the American Council of Learned Societies Fellowship (2004–05), Senior Fulbright Fellowship to France (1997–98) and the National Endowment for the Humanities Summer Stipend (1991). He currently serves as a senior fellow for the Institute for the Study of the Ancient World at New York University. He also serves on the editorial board for The World of the Bible.

Research
Fleming works broadly in ancient Near Eastern history, with anchors especially in second-millennium Syria and the first-millennium Levant as a matrix for ancient Israel and the Hebrew Bible. His research involves straddling two separate and sometimes territorial disciplines: Assyriology and biblical studies—both defined by written evidence that must be placed in context based on archaeological and visual sources as well. His framework for treating these domains as part of a whole is ultimately historical, and Fleming's individual projects have probed various aspects of the social fabric and political patterns that characterize the region in broad terms.

The Legacy of Israel in Judah's Bible
In his 2012 monograph The Legacy of Israel in Judah's Bible: History, Politics, and the Reinscribing of Tradition, Fleming puts forth a new theory and methodology for Hebrew Bible scholarship: isolating a tentative repertoire of Israelite traditions that can then be compared with external sources of historical evidence. After letting his theory serve as a catalyst for his doctoral students' research for several years, the publication set a new agenda for future engagement of ancient Israel and Hebrew Bible scholarship with wider study of antiquity. According to Fleming, his theory:

ultimately attempts to bridge between the worlds of biblical scholarship and archaeologically based history ... It addresses the structure and character of the Bible's primary narrative through [his] vision of a particular relationship between a hodgepodge of lore about early Israel that has been taken over and recast radically by generations of scribes from Judah. This Israelite lore, when considered on its own, presents a picture of ancient Israel that contrasts sufficiently with standard "biblical" schemes as to provoke reevaluation of what the Bible may offer historical investigation. It is [his] hope that by taking ever more seriously the biblical division between what comes from the distinct peoples of Israel and Judah, the character of each will come into sharper relief.

Fleming's work has received advanced praise among senior biblical scholars. David M. Carr writes that the monograph is "one of the most important books published in biblical studies in the last decade." Israel Finkelstein calls the book "a classic—a must for anyone interested in the Bible and the history of Ancient Israel." According to Mark S. Smith, Fleming's work "is a superb piece of scholarship," which "no professor or graduate student interested in the Hebrew Bible or ancient Israel can do without."

Grants and awards

Fellow, John Simon Guggenheim Memorial Foundation, 2004–2005, "In the Family of Abraham: Israel's Inland Heritage."
American Council of Learned Societies Fellowship, 2004–2005, "Politics and Scribal Traditions in Late Bronze Age Syria."
Senior Fulbright Scholar to France, 1997–1998, "Before Democracy: The Public Life of Towns in the Mari Archives."
Visiting research scholar at ISAW, 2013–14.
Professeur invité à la Société d'Histoire du Droit, l'Université Panthéon-Assas (Paris 2), December 2013. Four speaking engagements, including two law classes, in French.
Hebrew Bible invited plenary speaker, Society of Biblical Literature Annual Meeting of the Rocky Mountains – Great Plains region, April 2013; "The Bible and the Bronze Age: Benefits from a Chronological Mismatch."
Samuel Iwry Lecturer, The Johns Hopkins University, November 1, 2010; "The Legacy of Israel in Judah's Bible."
Professeur invité à la Section des Sciences Historiques et Philologiques de l'École Pratique des Hautes Études (la Sorbonne), Paris, March 2005; "Traditions politiques scribales à Emar et dans la *Syrie du Bronze Récent."  Four two-hour seminars led in French.
NYU Research Challenge Fund 1995, "The Ritual Calendar of Emar," fully funded.
NYU Presidential Fellowship 1994, "The Cycles of Ritual Time at Emar in Ancient Syria."
National Endowment for the Humanities Summer Stipend 1991, "Collating Ritual Tablets from Emar at Aleppo, Syria."

Bibliography

Monographs
The Legacy of Israel in Judah's Bible: History, Politics, and the Reinscribing of Tradition. Cambridge: Cambridge University Press, July 2012.
With Sara J. Milstein, The Buried Foundation of the Gilgamesh Epic: The Akkadian Huwawa Narrative. Cuneiform Monographs 39; Leiden: Brill, 2010.
Democracy's Ancient Ancestors: Mari and Early Collective Governance. Cambridge: Cambridge University Press, 2004.
Time at Emar: The Cultic Calendar and the Rituals from the Diviner's Archive, Mesopotamian Civilizations 11, Jerrold S. Cooper ed. Winona Lake, Ind.: Eisenbrauns, 2000.
The Installation of Baal's High Priestess at Emar: A Window on Ancient Syrian Religion, Harvard Semitic Studies 42. Atlanta: Scholars Press, 1992.

Articles and chapters
"Pastoralism and Nomadism" (20 pages) and "Emar" (30 pages), in Gonzalo Rubio ed., Handbook of Ancient Mesopotamia (Walter de Gruyter), submitted and forthcoming.
"The Amorites," in Bill T. Arnold and Brent A. Strawn eds., The World around the Old Testament: The Peoples and Places of the Ancient Near East. Grand Rapids, Mich.: Baker Academic, 2016, 1–30.
"Emar's entu Installation: Revising Ritual and Text Together," in Paul Delnero and Jacob Lauinger eds., Texts and Contexts: The Circulation and Transmission of Cuneiform Texts in Social Space (Berlin: de Gruyter, 2015) 29–47. 
With Sophie Démare-Lafont, "Emar Chronology and Scribal Streams: Cosmopolitanism and Legal Diversity," Revue d'Assyriologie 109 (2015) 45–77.
"Living by Livestock in Israel's Exodus: Explaining Origins over Distance," in Thomas E. Levy, Thomas Schneider, and William H. C. Propp eds., Israel's Exodus in Transdisciplinary Perspective: Text, Archaeology, Culture, and Geoscienceut. Heidelberg: Springer, 2015, 483–91.
"Seeing and Socializing with Dagan at Emar's zukru Festival," in Beate Pongratz-Leisten and Karen Sonik eds., volume on Materiality and the Divine in the Ancient Near East (Berlin: de Gruyter, 2015) 197–210.
"Chasing Down the Mundane: The Near East with Social Historical Interest," Journal of Ancient Near Eastern History 1 (2014) 5-20.
"David and the Ark: A Jerusalem Festival Reflected in Royal Narrative," in David S. Vanderhooft and Abraham Winitzer eds., Literature as Politics, Politics as Literature: Essays on the Ancient Near East in Honor of Peter Machinist (Winona Lake, Ind.: Eisenbrauns, 2013) 75–95.
"People without Town: The 'apiru in the Amarna Evidence," in Rebecca Hasselbach and Na'ama Pat-el eds., Language and Nature: Papers Presented to John Huehnergard on the Occasion of his 60th Birthday (Chicago: Oriental Institute, 2012) 39–49.
"Textual Evidence for a Palace at Late Bronze Emar," in Gernot Wilhelm ed., Organization, Representation, and Symbols of Power in the Ancient Near East. (CRRAI 54; Winona Lake, Ind.: Eisenbrauns, 2012) 101–9.
"The Day of Yahweh in the Book of Amos: A Rhetorical Response to Ritual Expectation," Revue Biblique 117 (2010) 20–38.
With Sophie Démare-Lafont, "Tablet Terminology at Emar: 'Conventional' and 'Free Format'," Aula Orientalis 27 (2009) 19–26.
"The Heavens Were Not Enough: Humanity and God's Home in the Book of Genesis," in D. A. Barreyra Fracaroli and G. del Olmo Lete eds., Reconstructing a Distant Past: Ancient Near Eastern Essays in Tribute to Jorge R. Silva Castillo. Barcelona: Editorial AUSA, 2009, 103–15.
"Kingship of City and Tribe Conjoined: Zimri-Lim at Mari," in Jeffrey Szuchman ed., Nomads, Tribes, and the State in the Ancient Near East: Cross-Disciplinary Perspectives. Chicago: Oriental Institute, 2009, 227–40.
"Reading Emar's Scribal Traditions against the Chronology of Late Bronze History," in Lorenzo d'Alfonso, Yoram Cohen, and Dietrich Sürenhagen eds., The City of Emar among the Late Bronze Age Empires: History, Landscape, and Society. Münster: Ugarit-Verlag, 2008, 27–43.
"The Integration of Household and Community Religion in Ancient Syria," in John Bodel and Saul M. Olyan eds., Household and Family Religion in Antiquity. Oxford: Blackwell, 2008, 37–59.
"From Joseph to David: Mari and Israelite Pastoralist Traditions," in Daniel I. Block ed., Israel: Ancient Kingdom or Late Invention. Nashville: B&H Academic, 2008, 78–96.
"Emar," in Fred Skolnik and Michael Berenbaum eds., Encyclopaedia Judaica Second Edition. Detroit: Macmillan Reference, 2007, 6.386-90.
"Anointing," in Bill T. Arnold and H.G.M. Williamson eds., Dictionary of the Old Testament Historical Books. Downers Grove, Ill.: InterVarsity Press, 2005, 32–6.
"Hebrews," in Dictionary of the Old Testament Historical Books, 386–90.
"Prophets and Temple Personnel in the Mari Archives," in Lester L. Grabbe and Alice Ogden Bellis eds., The Priests in the Prophets: The Portrayal of Priests, Prophets and Other Religious Specialists in the Latter Prophets. London: T & T Clark, 2004, 44–64.
"Southern Mesopotamian Titles for Temple Personnel in the Mari Archives," in John Kaltner and Louis Stulman eds., Inspired Speech: Prophecy in the Ancient Near East: Essays in Honor of Herbert B. Huffmon. London: T & T Clark, 2004, 72–81.
"Genesis in History and Tradition: The Syrian Background of Israel's Ancestors, Reprise," in James K. Hoffmeier and Alan Millard eds., The Future of Biblical Archaeology: Reassessing Methodologies and Assumptions. Grand Rapids, Mich.: Eerdmans, 2004, 193–232.
"The Sim'alite gayum and the Yaminite li'mum in the Mari Archives," Amurru 3. Paris: Editions Recherche sur les Civilisations, 2004, 199–212.
"Ur: After the Gods Abandoned Us," Classical World 97/1 (2003) 5-18; in papers from Matthew Santirocco ed., Saving the City: Destruction, Loss, and Recovery in the Ancient World (April 11–12, 2002, New York University).
"History in Genesis," Westminster Theological Journal 65 (2003) 251–62.
"Religion," in T. Desmond Alexander and David W. Baker eds., Dictionary of the Old Testament: Pentateuch. Downers Grove, Ill.: InterVarsity Press, 2003, 670–84.
"The Jerusalem Emar Tablets and the Excavated Archives," Journal of the Economic and Social History of the Orient 45 (2002) 365–76; review article of Joan Westenholz, Cuneiform Inscriptions in the Collection of the Bible Lands Museum Jerusalem: The Emar Tablets.
"Schloen's Patrimonial Pyramid: Explaining Bronze Age Society," Bulletin of the American Schools of Oriental Research (BASOR) 328 (2002) 73–80; review article of David Schloen, The House of the Father as Fact and Symbol: Patrimonialism in Ugarit and the Ancient Near East.
"Emar: On the Road from Harran to Hebron," in Mark W. Chavalas and K. Lawson Younger eds., Mesopotamia and the Bible. Grand Rapids, Mich.: Baker Academic, 2002, 222–50.
"Mari's Large Public Tent and the Priestly Tent Sanctuary," Vetus Testamentum (VT) 50 (2000) 484–98.
"Recent Work on Mari," Revue d'Assyriologie (RA) 93 (1999) 157–74.
"The Israelite Festival Calendar and Emar's Ritual Archive," Revue Biblique (RB) 106 (1999) 8-35.
"A Break in the Line: Reconsidering the Bible's Diverse Festival Calendars," RB 106 (1999) 161–74.
"The Seven-Day Siege of Jericho in Holy War," in Robert Chazan, William W. Hallo, and Lawrence Schiffman eds., Ki Baruch Hu: Ancient Near Eastern, Biblical, and Judaic Studies in Honor of Baruch A. Levine. Winona Lake, Ind.: Eisenbrauns, 1999, 209–22.
"Mari and the Possibilities of Biblical Memory," in J.-M. Durand and B. Lafont eds., Les traditions amorrites et la Bible, RA 92 (1998) 41–78.
"The Biblical Tradition of Anointing Priests," Journal of Biblical Literature (JBL) 117 (1998) 401–14.
"If El is a Bull, Who is a Calf?  Reflections on Religion in Second-Millennium Syria-Palestine," in B. A. Levine et al. eds., Frank M. Cross Festschrift, Eretz-Israel 26 (1999) 23*-7*.
"Counting Time at Mari and in Early Second-Millennium Mesopotamia," Mari. Annales de recherches interdisciplinaires (M.A.R.I.) 8 (1997) 675–92.
"The Emar Festivals: City Unity and Syrian Identity under Hittite Hegemony," in Mark W. Chavalas ed., Emar: The History, Religion, and Culture of a Syrian Town in the Late Bronze Age. Bethesda, Md.: CDL Press, 1996, 81–121.
"Psalm 127: A Word to the Fearful," Zeitschrift für die alttestamentliche Wissenschaft (ZAW) 107 (105) 435–44.
"More Help from Syria: Introducing Emar to Biblical Study," Biblical Archaeologist (BA) 58 (1995) 139–47.
"New Moon Celebration Once a Year: Emar's hidašu of Dagan," in Karel Van Lerberghe and Anton Schoors eds., Immigration and Emigration Within the Ancient Near East: Fesrschrift E. Lipinski.  Leuven: Peeters, 1995, 57–64.
"Job: The Tale of Patient Faith and the Book of God's Dilemma," VT 44 (1994) 468–82.
"By the Sweat of Your Brow: Adam, Anat, Athirat, and Ashurbanipal," G.J. Brooke, A.H.W. Curtis, and J.F. Healey eds., Ugarit and the Bible, Ugaritisch-Biblische Literatur 11. Neukirchen-Vluyn: Neukirchener, 1994, 93–100.
"Baal and Dagan in Ancient Syria," Zeitschrift für Assyriologie (ZA) 83 (1993) 88–98.
"nābû and munabbiātu: Two New Syrian Religious Personnel," Journal of the American Oriental Society (JAOS) 113 (1993) 175–83.
"The Etymological Origins of the Hebrew nābî': One Who Invokes God," Catholic Biblical Quarterly (CBQ) 55 (1993) 217–24.
"A Limited Kingship: Late Bronze Emar in Ancient Syria," Ugarit-Forschungen (UF) 24 (1992) 59–71.
"The Rituals from Emar: Evolution of an Indigenous Tradition in Second-Millennium Syria," in Mark W. Chavalas and John L. Hayes eds., New Horizons in the Study of Ancient Syria.  Malibu, Calif.: Undena, 1992, 51–61.
"The Voice of the Ugaritic Incantation-Priest (RIH 78/20)," UF 23 (1991) 141–54.

Notes and review
Review of Jonathan Stökl, Prophecy in the Ancient Near East: A Philological and Sociological Comparison, in NEA 78 (2015) 312–13.
Review of Wolfgang Heimpel, Letters to the King of Mari.  A New Translation, with Historical Introduction, Notes, and Commentary, in JAOS 124 (2004) 592–95.
Review of Regine Pruzsinszky, Die Personennamen der Texte aus Emar, in JAOS 124 (2004) 595–99.
Review of Norman Gottwald,  The Politics of Ancient Israel, in The Westminster Theological Journal 66 (2004) 425–29.
Review of Daniel Schwemer, Die Wettergottgestalten Mesopotamiens und Nordsyriens im Zeitalter der Keilschriftkulturen.  Materialien und Studien nach den schriftlichen Quellen, in ZA 93 (2003) 282–88.
Review of Paul Mankowski, Akkadian Loanwords in Biblical Hebrew, in CBQ 63 (2001) 528–29.
Review of Raymond Cohen and Raymond Westbrook eds., Amarna Diplomacy: The Beginnings of International Relations, in Bibliotheca Orientalis 58 (2001) 416–19.
Review of Gerald A. Klingbeil, A Comparative Study of the Ritual of Ordination as Found in Leviticus 8 and Emar 369, in Hebrew Studies 41 (2000) 278–80.
Review of Karen Rhea Nemet-Nejat, Daily Life in Ancient Mesopotamia, in Near East Archaeological Society Bulletin 44 (1999) 71–3.
Review of Stefano Seminara, L'Accadico di Emar, in JAOS 119 (1999) 701–2.
Review of Daniel Snell, Life in the Ancient Near East: 3100-322 B.C.E., in JBL 117 (1998) 718–20.
Review of Ada Feyerick, Genesis: World of Myths and Patriarchs, in Parabola, Spring 1998, 114–16.
Review of Richard S. Hess, Amarna Personal Names, in BASOR 304 (1996) 97–8.
Review of Hans J. Tertel, Text and Transmission: An Empirical Model for the Literary Development of Old Testament Narratives, CBQ 58 (1996) 138–39.
Review of Gregory Chirichigno, Debt-Slavery in Israel and the Ancient Near East, in CBQ 57 (1995) 546–47.
"'The Storm God of Canaan' at Emar," UF 26 (1994) 127–30.
"The Mountain Dagan: dKUR and (d)KUR.GAL," Notes assyriologiques brèves et utilitaires (N.A.B.U.) 1994, 17–8 (no. 16).
"Dagon," "Euphrates," "Nineveh," and "Tribute and Taxation: The Ancient Near East," Bruce Metzger and Michael D. Coogan eds., The Oxford Companion to the Bible. New York: Oxford University Press, 1993, 147, 206, 557, 779–81.
"Dagan and Itur-Mer at Mari," N.A.B.U. 1993, 1–2 (no. 2).
"The kilûtum Rites at Mari," N.A.B.U. 1993, 2 (no. 3).
"LÚ and MEŠ in lúna-bi-imeš and its Mari Brethren," N.A.B.U. 1993, 2–4 (no. 4).
Abstract of dissertation, in Mar Šipri (Assyriology newsletter for the U. S.), Spring 1991, two pages.
"The NIN.DINGIR/ittu at Emar," N.A.B.U. 1990, 5 (no. 8).
"'House'/'City': An Unrecognized Parallel Word Pair," JBL 105 (1986) 689–93.

Translations
"Ugaritic Incantation Against Sorcery" and "Rituals from Emar," in William W. Hallo and K. Lawson Younger eds., The Context of Scripture: Canonical Compositions from the Biblical World. Leiden: E. J. Brill, 1997, 301–2, 427–43.

Academic papers incorporated in publications
"Tablet Terminology at Emar and Ugarit: The Inadequacy of 'Syrian' and 'Syro-Hittite,'" American Oriental Society (AOS) Annual Meeting, March 2008.
"Kingship of City and Tribe Conjoined: Zimri-Lim at Mari," in Oriental Institute conference on "Nomads, Tribes, and the State in the Ancient Near East: Cross-Disciplinary Perspectives," March 7–8, 2008.
"Yale Does Not Assume Penn: A Reading Hypothesis for the Old Babylonian Gilgamesh Epic," AOS Annual Meeting, March 2007.
"The Legacy of Israel in a Jewish Bible," Society of Biblical Literature (SBL) Annual Meeting, November 2006.
"The Political Dimensions of Scribal Style at Emar," Konstanz colloquium, April 26–27, 2006.
"Emar's Solitary Priestesses," 2005 Annual Meeting of the Canadian Society for Mesopotamian Studies.
Response to Karel van der Toorn, Brown University conference on "Household and Family Religion," February 28 and March 1, 2005.
"The New Moon and the Day of Yahweh in the Book of Amos," SBL Annual Meeting, November 2004.
"From Joseph to David: Mari and Israelite Pastoralist Traditions," Louisville conference, January 15–17, 2004.
"Prophets and Temple Personnel in the Mari Archives," SBL Annual Meeting, November 2002.
"Ur: After the Gods Abandoned Us," NYU conference, April 11–12, 2002.
"Before Democracy: Collective Decision-Making in the Mari Archives," AOS Annual Meeting, March 2002.
"Genesis in History and Tradition: The Syrian Background of Israel's Ancestors, Reprise," Trinity Seminary conference on "The Future of Biblical Archaeology," August 2001.
"The Ark and its Shrines," New York University Conference on "The Biblical Icons of Israelite Religion," October 28–29, 2001.
"ālum and mātum at Mari: Second-Millennium Reflections of Early Political Structures," AOS Annual Meeting, March 2001.
"Mari's Large Public Tent and the Israelite Tent Sanctuary," SBL Annual Meeting, November 2000.
"The Sim'alite gayum and the Yaminite li'mum in the Mari Archives," 46th Rencontre Assyriologique Internationale, July 2000, Paris.
"Benjamin and the Binu-Yamina," American Schools of Oriental Research Annual Meeting, November 1999.
"On the Yaminites and the Sim'alites at Mari," AOS Annual Meeting, March 1999.
"A City Without Centralization: The Calendars of Late Bronze Emar," Tübingen, Würzburg, and Heidelberg Universities, February 1998.
« Au-delà des nomads: les archives de Mari et le paysage social israélite,» Table Ronde sur « Les traditions amorrites et la Bible,» June 1997.
"Emar: On the Road from Harran to Hebron," Near East Archaeology Society special colloquium on Syro-Mesopotamia and the Bible, November 1995.
"Leaving the City: zukru, akītu, and Hittite Festivals," 42nd Recontre Assyriologique Internationale, July 1995, Leuven.
"Emar as Reservoir of Ancient Polity," AOS Annual Meeting, March 1995.
"The Israelite Festival Calendar and Emar," SBL Annual Meeting, November 1994.
"Piecing Together the Emar Calendar," AOS Annual Meeting, March 1994.
"The Emar Festivals: City Unity and Identity under Hittite Hegemony," as one of two plenary speakers for the joint Annual Meeting of the Midwest Branch of the SBL, AOS, and American Schools of Oriental Research, February 1994.
"Job: The Tale of Patient Faith and the Book of God's Dilemma," SBL Annual Meeting, November 1993.
"The Biblical Tradition of Anointing Priests," SBL Annual Meeting, November 1993.
"The zukru New Year Rites: Evidence from Emar and Mari," AOS Annual Meeting, April 1993.
"A Limited Kingship: Late Bronze Emar in Ancient Syria," SBL Annual Meeting, November 1992.
"By the Sweat of Your Brow: Adam, Anat, Athirat and Ashurbanipal," International Symposium at the University of Manchester on Ugarit and the Bible, September 1992.
"Baal and Dagan in Ancient Syria," AOS Annual Meeting, March 1992.
"The Rituals from Emar: Evolution of an Indigenous Tradition in Second-Millennium Syria," Annual Meeting of the American Historical Association, December 1991.
"More Help from Syria: Introducing Emar to Biblical Study," SBL Annual Meeting, November 1991.
"Emar's Rites for the Dead: Text 452 (Msk 74146b)," AOS Annual Meeting, March 1991.
"*nābû, *munabbiātu, and nābî': West Semitic Religious Personnel and Akkadian nabû," SBL Annual Meeting, November 1990.
"Another Look at Ras Ibn Hani 78/20, the Incantation Against Underworld Demons," SBL Annual Meeting, November 1989.

References 

Religious studies scholars
American historians of religion
Stanford University alumni
Gordon–Conwell Theological Seminary alumni
Harvard Graduate School of Arts and Sciences alumni
New York University faculty
American male non-fiction writers
American Assyriologists
American biblical scholars
Old Testament scholars
Living people
1957 births
Assyriologists